Victor Hampton is the name of:

Victor Hampton (American football) (born 1992), American football cornerback for the Baltimore Ravens
Victor Hampton (EastEnders), fictional character